The Gibi National Forest is found in Liberia. It was established in 1960. This site is 607 km².

References

Protected areas of Liberia
Protected areas established in 1960
Nimba County